Word of Mouth is the third studio album by English-Irish boy band the Wanted. The album was released worldwide via Island Records on 4 November 2013. The album was preceded by the release of six singles: "Chasing the Sun", "I Found You", "Walks Like Rihanna", "We Own the Night", "Show Me Love (America)" and "Glow in the Dark", the latter of which was released two weeks prior to the album. It was the last studio album to feature singer Tom Parker before his death in March 2022. 

The album features production from a wide range of producers and was recorded over the course of two years, from 2011 to 2013. The Wanted toured the album with their first ever world tour, the Word of Mouth Tour, starting in February 2014.

Background and development
The Wanted began working on recording new material in November 2011, shortly after the release of their second studio album, Battleground. The band confirmed that they had worked with a number of different producers and collaborators whilst writing the material, in order to make something that would appeal to both American and British audiences. It was initially rumoured that the material that they were recording would be for a repackaged version of Battleground, which would contain a total of seven tracks which failed to make the initial cut, plus two brand new recordings, but this idea was later dismissed by band members Max George and Siva Kaneswaran. It was later revealed that the band had recorded a duet with a "female mega-star", rumoured to be Rihanna and the track, rumoured to be titled "Jealousy" would appear on their next album. Despite this, the band said that after the song had been mixed, tuned and finalised, the final mix "didn't cut it", and as such, the song had been completely scrapped, and was not going to be released.

In March 2012, the Wanted premiered the first track from the recording sessions, a track entitled "Chasing the Sun", written by English singer and rapper Example. Later that month, they premiered another new track, "Satellite", co-written by OneRepublic's Ryan Tedder. Both tracks went on to appear on the band's self-titled debut EP release in the United States. It was soon revealed that they were in fact in the midst of recording their third studio album. In October 2012, shortly after the premiere of their new single, "I Found You", rumours circulated the internet that the album would be titled Third Strike, and a track list and artwork were also "revealed". The track list contained a number of tracks which failed to make the cut of Battleground, several new recordings, plus collaborations with the likes of Chris Brown on "Loverboy", Rita Ora on "Mastermind" and LMFAO on "The Club's on Fire", as well as appearances from Dappy and Pitbull on the deluxe edition. Dappy's collaboration, "Bring It All Home", appears on his debut album Bad Intentions and Pitbull's collaboration, "Have Some Fun", appears on his seventh album Global Warming. However, in one of the band's "Wanted Wednesday" videos, Nathan Sykes revealed that the title and artwork were both fake. The track listing was later revealed to be fake as well, including all the collaborations.

In February 2013, it was announced that the Wanted would star in their own reality series called The Wanted Life, which premiered internationally in June 2013. The show was produced by Ryan Seacrest, as well as the band themselves. In the United States, it premiered on E! on 2 June 2013. The series featured clips of the band recording the album, including snippets of "We Own the Night" and "Show Me Love", two tracks which had not previously been premiered.

On 22 July 2013, after several delays, the album's title was officially announced as Word of Mouth and it was finally announced that it would be released on 16 September 2013, but on 9 September 2013, the band announced that, due to additional recording, the album would again be delayed, with a new release date of 4 November 2013. To compensate, however, the album's artwork and official track list were both revealed that day. Tom Parker explained that the further delay was due to the band adding some final tracks to the album, "It's taken us two years to make this album and now that it's finally finished we are all really proud of the time and effort, not just that we put in to it but all the writers and the label too. We think it's our strongest album to date. We can't wait for our fans to hear it. They've been really patient but hopefully they'll think it's worth the wait!" The band confirmed that tour mate Justin Bieber had written a song for them, but they declined it and told him to keep it for himself.

Promotion and release
On 7 May 2012, the Wanted performed "Chasing the Sun" on the second live results show of the sixth series of Britain's Got Talent. On 27 October 2013, they performed "Show Me Love (America)" live on the third live results show of the tenth series of The X Factor.

In the United States, the band performed a full live set on Good Morning America on 23 August 2013. To further promote the album, they did a series of performances on other TV shows on 4 November, the day before the album's U.S. release. They appeared on Live! with Kelly & Michael, The Late Show with David Letterman and Watch What Happens: Live, before another show at the MLB Fan Cave the following night. In 2014, they will embark on their first ever world tour, the Word of Mouth Tour, with shows in the UK, Ireland, France, Germany, Spain, the U.S. and Canada.

The album was released in three different editions: standard CD and digital download (14 tracks), deluxe CD and digital download (19 tracks – CD comes in deluxe gatefold digipack, with signed copies available from the band's official store), and MP3 badge edition (19 tracks in the form of a clip on MP3 player with the Wanted's logo on it, supplied with a set of headphones).

Critical reception

The album has received mixed reviews from music critics. Carl Smith of Sugarscape gave it 7.5/10 and said: "Word of Mouth could probably have gone from Good Boyband Album territory to Great Boyband Album status if it was a bit shorter. There are some amazing tracks on there that we're gonna be going back to a *lot*, but there's a bit of filler too. It's definitely worth the wait, though...and we're never really ones to turn down a boyband, let's be honest." In his review for AllMusic, Matt Collar gave the album 3.5/5 and wrote: "The Wanted have always seemed somewhat older and more mature than many of their contemporaries. That, combined with the band's broader musical palette (especially for a boy band) that touches upon a bit of passionate rock balladry ("Love Sewn"), some very Daft Punk-esque electronica ("Glow in the Dark"), and more than a few post-U2 anthems ("Could This Be Love"), they often seem more in line with bands like Maroon 5 and OneRepublic than other teen pop acts. Of course, there are enough fun, dance club-ready cuts on Word of Mouth—with songs like "Walks Like Rihanna" and the '70s falsetto-heavy disco-house standout "I Found You"—to ensure that the band's many younger, mainstream pop fans will have something to enjoy. Ultimately, if the Wanted's plan is to build upon the higher profile they've gained since their reality series, then Word of Mouth is certainly something to shout about."

Brian Mansfield of USA Today was more negative and said, "English-Irish band the Wanted has a more continental sensibility than One Direction. Its third full-length album is its first stateside, after a string of singles with diminishing returns. So while "Show Me Love (America)" isn't a plea, it might as well be." He gave the album 2.5 stars out of 5. Similarly, Ian Gittins of Virgin Media gave the album two stars and called it "pop for pre-teens, for the easily impressed, and for those who are too credulous to know any better. The bland leading the bland.", but admitted that "it will do incredibly well." In another two-stars-out-of-five review, Digital Spy's Lewis Corner wrote, "aside from the singles, Word of Mouth has little else to offer. 'In the Middle' is an inoffensive air-grabbing mid-tempo and 'Demons' offers a marginally harder tone with its guitar-backed chorus. But elsewhere, 'Summer Alive' is throwaway boyband EDM, while the sway of 'Love Sewn' is more limp than the soggy bottom of a fruit tart."

Chart performance
On 8 November 2013, the album debuted at number ten on the Irish Singles Chart. Three days later, it charted at number nine on the UK Albums Chart. 
The album also debuted and peaked at number 17 in the United States.

Singles
In September 2011, it was announced that English singer and rapper Example had written a track for the Wanted. In an interview with the Daily Record, Example said, "I wrote a song for them called "Chasing the Sun" and it's great. They went into the studio yesterday and Max even cryptically tweeted that it was a tune...I thought a few people might want it at first, including Enrique Iglesias and Kylie because both have asked me to write songs for them. But as soon as someone mentioned the Wanted, I thought it was right." "Chasing the Sun" was released in the UK as the album's lead single on 20 May 2012. It was also released as the third single from the band's self-titled EP in the United States on 17 April, and was included as one of the two theme songs for the 2012 animated film Ice Age: Continental Drift. It peaked at number two on the UK Singles Chart, giving the band their sixth UK top ten hit.

In August 2012, the band filmed a music video in Los Angeles, reportedly for their brand new single, "I Found You". However, when the video for "I Found You" was released in October 2012, a different video was revealed. The Wanted announced that they re-filmed the video after they were unimpressed with the result of the first, however the first cut was later released as the "fan edition" of the video in January 2013. "I Found You" was released as the album's second single on 4 November and peaked at number three on the UK Singles Chart. "Walks Like Rihanna" was released as the album's third single on 24 June 2013. In April 2013, the band announced the release of the third single, named after close friend and Barbadian singer Rihanna. The single debuted at number four in the UK.

"We Own the Night" was released as the album's fourth single on 10 August 2013, being released on the week that the track premiered on radio, and the music video was released to Vevo. The single peaked at number 10 on the UK, and its music video was the most played video on UK music channels two weeks in a row following its release. The song was used as the official theme for The Wolverine, appearing in the opening and end credits of the film. "Show Me Love (America)" was released as the album's fifth single on 25 October 2013, a week prior to the album's release. The music video was filmed in September 2013. The track premiered on radio on 10 September 2013. They performed the song on The X Factor on 27 October. "Glow in the Dark" was released as the album's sixth and final single on 23 March 2014. It was announced at the same time they decided to take a break from recording music.

Track listing

Notes
 signifies an additional producer.

Charts and certifications

Charts

Certifications

Release history

References

2013 albums
Island Records albums
The Wanted albums
Albums produced by Dr. Luke
Albums produced by Cirkut
Albums produced by Fraser T. Smith
Albums produced by Steve Mac
Albums produced by the Runners